Patton Peter Oswalt (born January 27, 1969) is an American actor, stand-up comedian, and writer. His acting roles include Spence Olchin in the sitcom The King of Queens (1998–2007) and narrating the sitcom The Goldbergs (2013–present) as adult Adam F. Goldberg. After making his acting debut in the Seinfeld episode "The Couch", he has appeared in a variety of television series, such as Parks and Recreation, Community, Two and a Half Men, Drunk History, Reno 911!, Mystery Science Theater 3000, Archer, Veep, Justified, Kim Possible, and Brooklyn Nine-Nine, portraying Principal Ralph Durbin in A.P. Bio (2018–2021) and Matthew the Raven in the TV series The Sandman (2022–present).

Oswalt has voiced Remy in the animated film Ratatouille (2007), Max in the animated film The Secret Life of Pets 2 (2019), Jesse (male) in the game Minecraft: Story Mode, and
M.O.D.O.K in the 2021 animated series of the same name. Other film credits include Man on the Moon (1999), Zoolander (2001), Blade: Trinity (2004), All Roads Lead Home (2008), Big Fan (2009), A Very Harold & Kumar 3D Christmas (2011), 22 Jump Street (2014), and The Circle (2017). In the Marvel Cinematic Universe (MCU) multimedia franchise, Oswalt guest starred as the Koenigs on Agents of S.H.I.E.L.D. (2014–2020) and voiced Pip the Troll in Eternals (2021). He was also in the web series, Best of the Worst in 2019.

As a stand-up comedian, Oswalt has appeared in six stand-up specials and won a Primetime Emmy Award for Outstanding Writing for a Variety Special and a Grammy Award for Best Comedy Album for the album of his Netflix special Patton Oswalt: Talking for Clapping (2016).

Early life
Oswalt was born on January 27, 1969, in Portsmouth, Virginia, the son of Carla and Larry J. Oswalt, a career United States Marine Corps officer. He was named after General George S. Patton. Oswalt is of Italian, Irish, German, English, and Scottish descent. He has one younger brother, Matt Oswalt, a comedy writer best known for writing and starring in the YouTube web series Puddin. While he was a military brat, his family lived in Ohio and in Tustin, California, before settling in Sterling, Virginia. He is a 1987 graduate of Broad Run High School in Ashburn, Virginia. He later graduated from The College of William & Mary where he majored in English and was initiated into the Alpha Theta chapter of the Phi Kappa Tau fraternity.

Career

Oswalt began performing stand-up comedy on July 18, 1988. After writing for MADtv and starring in his own 1996 comedy special for HBO, he went on to garner notable roles in films and television shows with his film debut coming in the 1996 military comedy film Down Periscope alongside Kelsey Grammer. His television debut was on the Seinfeld episode "The Couch". His most prominent and longest running role was as Spence Olchin on The King of Queens. His first starring film role was as the voice of Remy, the lead character in the 2007 Academy Award-winning Pixar film Ratatouille. He has also appeared in smaller roles in such films as Magnolia and 22 Jump Street.

Oswalt wrote the comic book story "JLA: Welcome to the Working Week", a backup story in Batman #600; a story for Dwight T. Albatross's The Goon Noir #01 and a story for Masks: Too Hot for TV. Expanding his voice artist repertoire, he began voicing the villainous character Tobey on PBS Kids GO! series WordGirl in 2007. He also appeared on the Comedy Central Roast of William Shatner. He appeared on the Comedy Central Roast of Flavor Flav in August 2007. That same year, he appeared on an episode of SpongeBob SquarePants, "The Original Fry Cook", as Jim. Oswalt moderated a reunion panel of the Mystery Science Theater 3000 cast at the San Diego Comic-Con International in 2008.

Oswalt played Paul Aufiero, the leading role in Robert D. Siegel's 2009 directorial debut, Big Fan. He was set to star in a 2010 Broadway revival of Lips Together, Teeth Apart. The show was postponed, then eventually canceled, when Megan Mullally left the production after the director denied her request to replace Oswalt due to his lack of stage experience.

He starred in the Showtime drama The United States of Tara as Neil, an employee of Four Winds Landscaping. He also provided the voice of Thrasher, a robot protagonist from the Cartoon Network show Robotomy.

Oswalt emceed the 2010 BookExpo America, promoting his then-upcoming book Zombie Spaceship Wasteland and introducing the evening's panelists: Christopher Hitchens, William Gibson, and Sara Gruen. Oswalt released Zombie Spaceship Wasteland in 2011.

Oswalt played the role of Hurlan Heartshe in the 2011 surrealist comedy miniseries The Heart, She Holler on Cartoon Network's late-night programming block, Adult Swim. Oswalt appeared in the 2011 film A Very Harold & Kumar 3D Christmas. Oswalt played Matt Freehauf in Jason Reitman's 2011 black comedy Young Adult. He played Billy Stanhope, ex-best friend of Ashton Kutcher's Walden Schmidt on Two and a Half Men in 2012.

As of September 2013, Oswalt narrates the TV series The Goldbergs. He also had a recurring role as Constable Bob Sweeney in the fourth season of the FX series Justified.

Patton played the role of Agent Koenig on the TV series Agents of S.H.I.E.L.D. He later appeared in separate episodes as brothers Eric and Billy Koenig. He continued to appear in the second season as Billy and a third brother named Sam. In season four, he also played a fourth brother, Thurston.

Oswalt's memoir Silver Screen Fiend: Learning About Life from an Addiction to Film was published by Simon & Schuster in 2015. He also voiced the male version of Jesse in Minecraft: Story Mode, which was released in October 2015.

Oswalt played Max in the reboot of Mystery Science Theater 3000, as the son of Frank Conniff's character TV's Frank. The program premiered on Netflix in 2017.

Also in 2017, lifelong film fan Oswalt provided the voice of horror icon Boris Karloff in several episodes of film critic Karina Longworth’s podcast You Must Remember This, for the season entitled “Bela and Boris.”

Oswalt had a voice-over role in science fiction comedy film Sorry to Bother You, which was released in theaters on July 6, 2018.

Oswalt replaced Louis C.K. in the 2019 film The Secret Life of Pets 2, as the voice of main character Max. In addition, he reprised his role as Professor Dementor in the Disney Channel Original Movie Kim Possible, a live action adaptation of the 2002-2007 animated series.

On April 15, 2019, Oswalt joined a host of other writers in firing their agents as part of the WGA's stand against the ATA and the practice of packaging.

Oswalt's stand-up comedy covers topics ranging from pop culture frivolity, such as comic book supervillains and 1980s glam metal, to deeper social issues like American excess, materialism, foreign policy, and religion. He also discusses his atheism in his stand-up. He recorded his third comedy album at the Lisner Auditorium at George Washington University in Washington, D.C. on February 28, 2009. It premiered on Comedy Central as Patton Oswalt: My Weakness Is Strong on August 23, 2009, and was released on DVD August 25, 2009.

An animated video of Patton's take on New Song's Christmas Shoes was posted on YouTube in November 2009. The track does not appear on any albums. The audio is claimed to be recorded at Lisner Auditorium in Washington DC.

Oswalt's album Patton Oswalt: Finest Hour was released on September 19, 2011. The extended and uncensored DVD of this special was released in April 2012, a few days after its television premiere on Comedy Central.

Oswalt's comedy special Tragedy Plus Comedy Equals Time was to be released on January 16, 2014, via online movie streaming website Epix, but was pushed back by the company for unknown reasons. However, it did premiere on Comedy Central on April 6, 2014, and became available for purchase on April 8, 2014, in both DVD and CD format.

Oswalt's comedy special Talking for Clapping was released on Netflix on April 22, 2016. For the album, he received a Primetime Emmy Award for Outstanding Writing for a Variety Special and a Grammy Award for Best Comedy Album.

Oswalt's comedy special Annihilation was released on Netflix on October 17, 2017.

In an episode of Hiking with Kevin Nealon on YouTube, posted November 14, 2019, Oswalt confirmed a new special, I Love Everything, recorded three weeks prior to the recording of the hike. It is currently airing on Netflix and was nominated for another Primetime Emmy Award.

He was featured in an ad campaign for Caesars Sportsbook in 2021, playing a character named Carl.

He was featured on the celebrity version of Jeopardy! on January 26, 2023.

Personal life
Oswalt married true crime writer and journalist Michelle McNamara on September 24, 2005. They had one daughter together, Alice, born in April 2009.

McNamara died in her sleep in the family's Los Angeles, California, home on April 21, 2016. Her death was attributed to a combination of a previously undiagnosed heart condition and complications from ingested medications (Adderall, Xanax, and Fentanyl). The season-three finale of The Goldbergs was dedicated to her memory.

On August 1, 2016, Oswalt announced that he had been working to complete McNamara's unfinished nonfiction book about the Golden State Killer. In September 2017, Oswalt announced that the book, titled I'll Be Gone in the Dark, was scheduled for release on February 27, 2018, and was subsequently available for preorders. Less than two months after the book's release, on April 25, 2018, the Sacramento County Sheriff's Department announced they had made an arrest in the Golden State Killer case. Oswalt posted a brief video to Instagram, saying: "I think you got him, Michelle." He also posted on Twitter that same day, saying that he hoped to visit the suspect if he was indeed the Golden State Killer, "not to gloat or gawk - to ask him the questions that [McNamara] wanted answered in her 'Letter to an Old Man'" at the end of her book.

Oswalt is a longtime comic book fan, which he has discussed in his stand up as well as writing a few issues for comics.

In July 2017 he and actress Meredith Salenger were confirmed to be engaged. They were married in November 2017.

In 2013, he teamed up with PETA, spoke out against chaining pet dogs, and sent a letter to the mayor and members of the city council of Newport News, Virginia, urging them to ban the practice.

Oswalt is an outspoken atheist and has referred to his atheism in his comedy specials: No Reason to Complain, Feelin' Kinda Patton, My Weakness Is Strong, and Finest Hour.

Oswalt's influences include Jonathan Winters, Richard Pryor, Emo Philips, Blaine Capatch, Jim Goad, Bill Hicks, Bobcat Goldthwait, Sam Kinison, Steve Martin, and Louis C.K.

Oswalt endorsed Barack Obama for re-election as president in 2012. Oswalt was an outspoken critic of former President Donald Trump. In January 2019, following an intense Twitter feud with a Trump supporter, he donated $2,000 to the man's GoFundMe fund created to help cover his medical expenses.

Discography
Comedy albums

 Comedy specials EPs'''
 Patton vs. Alcohol vs. Zach vs. Patton (2005) with Zach Galifianakis
 Melvins/Patton Oswalt split 7 (2006) with Melvins
 Comedians of Comedy Tour (2006)
 The Pennsylvania Macaroni Company (2006) with Brian Posehn, Maria Bamford, and Eugene Mirman
 Frankensteins and Gumdrops (2008) - available during the WFMU pledge drive

Compilation album appearances
 Beth Lapides's Un-Cabaret – The Un & Only (2002)
 Beth Lapides's Un-Cabaret – The Good, The Bad, and the Drugly (2006)
 Comedy Death-Ray (2007)

Filmography

Film

Television

Video games

Music videos

Web series

Theme park attractions

Awards and nominations

Emmy Awards

Grammy Awards

Miscellaneous awards

Bibliography

Autobiography
 Zombie Spaceship Wasteland (Scribner, 2011) 
 Silver Screen Fiend: Learning About Life from an Addiction to Film (Simon & Schuster, 2015)

Non-fiction
 The Overrated Book (co-author with Henry H. Owings, Last Gasp (publisher), San Francisco, 2006)  
 The Rock Bible: Unholy Scripture for Fans & Bands (co-author with Henry H. Owings, Quirk Books, Philadelphia, 2008)

Comics
 JLA: Welcome to the Working Week (DC Comics, 2003)
 The Goon: Noir (co-author with Thomas Lennon, Steve Niles, and Eric Powell, Dark Horse Comics, 2007)
 Bart Simpson's Treehouse of Horror 13 (Bongo Comics, 2007)
 Justice League of America: The Lightning Saga (foreword, DC Comics, 2008)
 Serenity: Float Out (Dark Horse Comics, 2010)
 Better Days and Other Stories (co-author with Will Conrad, Dark Horse Comics, 2011) 
 Sky Cake! (co-author with Kona Morris, Jon Olsen, Chris Henry. Godless Comics, 2012) 
 M.O.D.O.K.: Head Games (co-writer with Jordan Blum. Marvel Comics, Dec 2020)
 Minor Threats (co-writer with Jordan Blum. Dark Horse Comics, 2022)

References

External links
  
 
 
 
 
 
Patton Oswalt  at Comedy Central
Audio interview on The Sound of Young America from PRI.
 on public radio program The Sound of Young America

1969 births
Living people
20th-century American comedians
20th-century American male actors
21st-century American comedians
21st-century American male actors
American atheism activists
American comics writers
American male comedians
American male film actors
American male television actors
American male television writers
American male video game actors
American male voice actors
American people of English descent
American people of German descent
American people of Irish descent
American people of Italian descent
American people of Scottish descent
American stand-up comedians
American television writers
Audiobook narrators
California Democrats
College of William & Mary alumni
Grammy Award winners
Male actors from Virginia
People from Portsmouth, Virginia
People from Sterling, Virginia
Primetime Emmy Award winners
Shorty Award winners
Stand Up! Records artists
Sub Pop artists
Virginia Democrats
Warner Records artists